Copeland Bridge, also known as Copeland Farm Bridge or Copeland Covered Bridge is a wooden covered bridge over Beecher Creek in the town of Edinburg in Saratoga County, New York.  It was built in 1879, and is a small, timber framed, queenpost truss bridge with a gable roof.  It has a 30-foot span carried on fieldstone abutments.

It was listed on the National Register of Historic Places in 1998.

References

External links
 Copeland Covered Bridge photos and more, at The Historical Marker Database
 Copeland Farm Bridge, at New York State Covered Bridge Society
 Copeland Bridge, at Covered Bridges of the Northeast USA

Covered bridges on the National Register of Historic Places in New York (state)
Bridges completed in 1879
Wooden bridges in New York (state)
Tourist attractions in Saratoga County, New York
Bridges in Saratoga County, New York
National Register of Historic Places in Saratoga County, New York
Road bridges on the National Register of Historic Places in New York (state)
Queen post truss bridges in the United States
1879 establishments in New York (state)